The Battle of the Kalâa of the Beni Abbes took place during the winter of 1553 and opposed the regency of Algiers to the Kingdom of Beni Abbas.

In order to counterbalance the influence of Sultan Abdelaziz of the Kalaa, Salah Rais ordered an expedition against the Kalaa of the Beni Abbes to annihilate his influence. The army of the Regency camped at Bona, a league from the Kalaa. Abdelaziz made a sortie against them and defeated them after a clash which was deadly for both sides. The armies of the Regency were forced to retreat after heavy losses, and this battle diminished their reputation. The victory allowed Sultan Abdelaziz to confirm his control over the Bibans and the Hodna. The following year the Regency of Algiers directed another expedition against Abdelaziz in the Battle of Oued-el-Lhâm.

See also

Second Battle of Kalaa of the Beni Abbes
Kalâa of Ait Abbas
Regency of Algiers
Kingdom of Ait Abbas
Campaign of Tlemcen (1551)

References

Kalaa of the Beni Abbes
Kalaa of the Beni Abbes
Kalaa of the Beni Abbes
Kingdom of Ait Abbas
Kalaa of the Beni Abbes
Kalaa of the Beni Abbes
 16th century in Algiers